
Laguna La Angostura is a lake in the Cochabamba Department, Bolivia. At an elevation of 2700 m, its surface area is 10.5 km².

References 

Lakes of Cochabamba Department